Thibault Charles Marie Septime de Montalembert (born 10 February 1962) is a French theatre, film and television actor. He is perhaps best known for his roles in the television series The Tunnel (2013–2018) and Call My Agent! (2015–2020).

Career
He was a resident of the Comédie-Française from 1994 to 1996.

Theatre

Filmography

Dubbing
Thibault de Montalembert is the French voice of Hugh Grant and several other actors.

References

External links
 

1962 births
Living people
People from Laval, Mayenne
French male stage actors
French male film actors
French male television actors
French male voice actors
20th-century French male actors
21st-century French male actors